Coyaima is a town and municipality in the Tolima department of Colombia.  The population of the municipality was 27,733 as of the 2005 census.

Municipalities of Tolima Department